

Northgate Computer Systems, Inc., based in Eden Prairie, Minnesota, United States, was a mail-order personal computer company, founded in 1987 by Arthur "Art"  Lazere.

The 1990s were a golden era for mail-order PC business. Consumers were fed up with high prices for IBM, Compaq and other brand-name PCs sold through dealers so they opted to purchase their computers from a catalog. This was a revolutionary idea at the time, because people wouldn't be able to see or touch their computer before buying it. Aside from Dell and Gateway, popular brands of mail-order PCs were Northgate and Zeos.

The company was known for its quality systems and keyboards; in particular, its line of OmniKey keyboards was highly praised. The keyboards were particularly valued for their tactile response and durability, and along with IBM's Model M PC keyboards, were considered some of the best in the industry.  As such, the company's keyboards were often purchased by users of other manufacturers' PCs.

History
 1987 - founded by Arthur Lazere
1989 - 386 Systems available.
 1990 - Announced 486 systems using IBM's Micro Channel architecture and merger talks with CPT.
 1992 - Discussed a merger with Everex Systems but these talks ended and a 51% stake was bought by investor group Marjac Investments.
 August 1994 - A chapter 7 petition was filed against the company by creditors.
 September 1994 - The company filed for a conversion to a chapter 11 reorganization plan.  Mylex was owed $4.6 million, $113,000 was expected to be paid from liquidation from Northgate's inventories.  The landlord of their Eden Prairie building also canceled their lease and they were planning to move to Minneapolis.
 December 22, 1995 - Announced a reorganization plan with its creditors which paid 19 cents on the dollar to cover $16 million in unsecured debts.  The funding would be from a percentage of computer sales up to a maximum of $3.75 million.
 1997 - Northgate was purchased by Lan Plus.
 October 2000 - Lan Plus begins merger with Mcglen Internet Group.
 April 16, 2001 - Mcglen and Lan Plus announces that the merged company will be operating under the Northgate name.
 September 10, 2001 - Lan Plus and Mcglen expect to complete the merger by October under the name Northgate Innovations with Andy Teng as chairman and CEO.  However the completion of the merger wasn't announced until March.
 September 20, 2002 - Announced a "Volunteer Training Program" with local technical schools to provide real-world computer manufacturing experience.  Their principal executive offices are now in the city of Industry, California.
 2003 - Announced a trial with 7-Eleven to sell Northgate Computer branded PCs through their stores.
 2004 - Name changed to Digital Lifestyles Group to focus on the "teen computing and digital lifestyle" market with a new "hip-e" brand.
 2005 - On April 25 an announcement on their web site stated "Northgate Computers will close its operations to all customers. Northgate will no longer supply any type of warranty services inclusive of technical phone support."

After Northgate went out of business, Creative Vision Technologies picked up the line of keyboards, marketing them under the Avant brand.  However, CVT was acquired by Ideal System Solutions in 2011 and the product is no longer listed.

References

American companies established in 1987
American companies disestablished in 2005
Computer companies established in 1987
Computer companies disestablished in 2005
Defunct computer companies of the United States
Defunct computer hardware companies
Defunct companies based in Minnesota
Companies based in Eden Prairie, Minnesota